Troublesome Night 9 is a 2001 Hong Kong horror comedy film produced by Nam Yin and directed by Ivan Lai. It is the ninth of the 20 films in the Troublesome Night film series.

Plot
Ms Liu, a compulsive gambler, meets Bud Pit on a cruise ship. When he tries to help her win, his girlfriend, Moon, becomes unhappy because Ms Liu has been neglecting her dying grandmother. Later, she visits Bud Pit's mother, the expert ghostbuster Mrs Bud Lung. When she asks Mrs Bud Lung to bless her so that she will win every time she gambles, Mrs Bud Lung tells her to clean up her parents' graves instead. She removes the weeds from her parents' graves and puts the rubbish on nearby graves. The angry spirits of the dead come to haunt her.

Cast
 Simon Lui as Bud Pit
 Law Lan as Mrs Bud Lung
 Maggie Cheung Ho-yee as Ms Liu
 Halina Tam as Moon
 Mr Nine as Kau
 Onitsuka as Baat
 Cheng Chu-fung as cruise ship manager
 Sherming Yiu as gambler on cruise ship
 Wayne Lai as gambler on cruise ship
 Tong Ka-fai as Bud Gay
 Jameson Lam as gambler in Ms Liu's dream
 Ho Chung-wai as Jason
 Hui Pik-kei as nurse

External links
 
 

2001 comedy horror films
2001 films
Hong Kong comedy horror films
2000s Cantonese-language films
Troublesome Night (film series)
2000s Hong Kong films